Sverre Halvorsen (12 June 1891 – 11 April 1936) was a Norwegian illustrator.

He was born in Kristiania.

References

1891 births
1936 deaths
Norwegian illustrators
Artists from Oslo